Russell Walter Michna (born February 3, 1981) is a former arena football quarterback. A two-time league champion of the United Football League (UFL), he is the only player that has been signed to a team in every current major professional football league: National Football League (NFL), Canadian Football League (CFL), UFL and AFL. Michna also played in the Continental Indoor Football League (CIFL).

Michna played college football for Western Illinois University, leading the Leathernecks to back-to-back I-AA Playoff appearances. However, Western Illinois lost to Western Kentucky and Colgate. He was a two-time Gateway Conference Offensive Player of the Year. He went undrafted in the 2004 NFL Draft, but signed an undrafted free agent contract with the St. Louis Rams. After spending the 2004 season on the practice squad, he failed to make the Rams' roster in 2005. Following his release, he signed with the Winnipeg Blue Bombers of the CFL. After spending the most of the season as a back-up, Michna played in a few games for the Blue Bombers due to Tee Martin's ineffectiveness. After just a single game with the Blue Bombers in 2006, he was released. He then joined the Chicago Rush in 2007, where he spent the season as the back-up to Matt D'Orazio. In 2008, the Rush signed AFL legend Sherdrick Bonner, making Michna the back-up once again, but an injury to Bonner forced Michna into action. Michna didn't disappoint, leading the Rush to a 7-3 record down the stretch, clinching the 2008 Central Division Championship. When the AFL suspended operations in 2009, Michna agreed to play for the Chicago Slaughter of the Continental Indoor Football League (CIFL). Michna and other members of the Rush, lead the Slaughter to a perfect 12-0 regular season, and defeated the Fort Wayne Freedom in the 2009 CIFL Championship Game. After the indoor season ended, Michna signed with the newly formed UFL's Las Vegas Locomotives. Michna served as a back-up on the Locomotives for two seasons, as the team would win back-to-back UFL Championship Games. When the AFL restructured in 2010, Michna re-signed with the Rush, as served as their starting quarterback for two seasons. After starting the 2013 season not on a roster, the San Jose SaberCats signed him two a two-year contract, and traded incumbent starter Aaron Garcia to Orlando, making Michna the unquestioned starter.

Early years
Michna attended James B. Conant High School in Hoffman Estates, Illinois and was a student and a letterman in football, basketball, and baseball. In football, he was an All-State selection as a senior. Russ Walter Michna graduated from James B. Conant High School in 1999.

College career
Michna played college football at Western Illinois University. Michna spent his first two seasons with the Leathernecks as the backup quarterback to Sam Clemons, who guided the team to a Gateway Conference Championship in 2000. As a junior in 2002, Michna became the starter quarterback, and lead the Leathernecks to back-to-back I-AA Playoff appearances. However, Western Illinois lost to Western Kentucky and Colgate. Michna was the Gateway Conference Offensive Player of the Year in 2002 and 2003.

College career statistics

Professional career

St. Louis Rams (2004–2005)
After going undrafted in the 2004 NFL Draft, Michna signed as an undrafted free agent with the St. Louis Rams. He spent the 2004 season on the Rams' practice squad, but was released during training camp in 2005.

Winnipeg Blue Bombers (2005–2006)
After his release from the Rams, he signed with the Winnipeg Blue Bombers of the Canadian Football League. After starting quarterback Kevin Glenn suffered an injury, Michna saw game action when back-up Tee Martin was ineffective. He appeared in one game with the Blue Bombers in 2006 before he was released on August 20.

Chicago Rush (2007–2008)
Michna joined the Chicago Rush of the Arena Football League in 2007, after the team was coming off a victory in ArenaBowl XX. He spent the season as the team's second-string quarterback behind Matt D'Orazio and in the regular season, completed just two of three passes for 44 yards. However, a back injury hampered D'Orazio at the end of the season. Although, D'Orazio started both of the Rush playoff games, Michna saw action in each. In the opening game, the Rush took a 31-14 lead over the Los Angeles Avengers, en route to a 52-20 win. This allowed D'Orazio to rest,  Michna completed all six of his passes for 73 yards. The following week, on the road against the San Jose Sabercats in the conference championship, D'Orazio started, but was ineffective with the back injury. He completed just six of 18 passes with three interceptions. The Sabercats jumped out to a 28-7 lead, and Michna came in. He went 22 of 30 for 247 yards, five touchdowns to one pick, but the Rush could not complete the comeback, and fell 61-49. It was the third time the Rush met San Jose in the AFL semifinals, and second time the team lost. San Jose would go on to win ArenaBowl XXI with a 55-33 win over the Columbus Destroyers.

In 2008, D'Orazio signed with the Philadelphia Soul, and the Rush signed AFL veteran Sherdrick Bonner, who figured to be the starter. However, Bonner got injured early in the season and Michna was named the Rush's starting quarterback. He would lead the team the rest of the way, even when Bonner got healthy. Michna finished the season with 57 touchdowns, seven interceptions and 2,721 yards on 239 completions and 351 attempts. The Rush finished the season 11-5, won the division, and for the first time in franchise history, had home field advantage for the playoffs. However, the Grand Rapids Rampage, who made the playoffs as a wild card seed with just a 6-10 record, stunned the Rush with a 58-41 upset in the Divisional Playoffs.

Chicago Slaughter (2009)
When the Arena Football League suspended operations in 2009, Michna signed with the Chicago Slaughter of the CIFL, along with other Rush players and coaches Donovan Morgan, Bobby Sippio, Dennison Robinson, DeJuan Alfonzo, and Bob McMillen. Michna led the Chicago Slaughter to an undefeated record (14-0) and a CIFL Championship.  He was named the CIFL Offensive Player of the week 1 time and was named league MVP. Not only had he led the Chicago Slaughter to their first undefeated season, he had also led the Chicago Slaughter to its first championship. Michna has also broken the record for most touchdowns in a game (twice, the second time he broke his own record.)

Las Vegas Locomotives (2009–2010)
Michna was signed by the Las Vegas Locomotives of the United Football League on August 31, 2009 and served as a back-up during the Locos championship run.

Although cut before the season began, Michna returned to the Locos in 2010 when an injury to Tim Rattay opened a slot as back-up again on the Locos' roster.

Return to the Rush (2010–2012)
Michna was re-signed by the Chicago Rush on January 2, 2010. He was once again the team's starting quarterback. In fourteen contests, he completed 290 of 423 passes for 3,860 yards, 70 touchdowns and 11 interceptions for a quarterback rating of 126.0. It was good enough to finish second in the league in passer rating, behind Milwaukee Iron quarterback Chris Greisen, who would sign with the Dallas Cowboys at the end of the year.

For the 2011 season, he switched his jersey number from 8 to 12, which he wore in college. Michna led the Rush to a 9-3 record before suffering an ankle injury. In 12 games, he put up 2,896 yards, 66 touchdowns, 13 interceptions and completed 236 of 354 passes for a 116.0 rating.

San Jose SaberCats (2013–2014)
On April 22, 2013, the San Jose SaberCats announced that they have been assigned Michna on a two-year contract. San Jose also placed quarterback Aaron Garcia on recallable reassignment, and later traded him to Orlando, to make room on the 24-man roster.

References

External links
Arena Football League bio
Just Sports Stats

1981 births
Living people
People from Elk Grove Village, Illinois
Players of American football from Illinois
American football quarterbacks
American players of Canadian football
Canadian football quarterbacks
Western Illinois Leathernecks football players
St. Louis Rams players
Winnipeg Blue Bombers players
Chicago Rush players
Chicago Slaughter players
Las Vegas Locomotives players
San Jose SaberCats players
James B. Conant High School alumni